Antony John Green  (born 2 March 1960) is an Australian psephologist and commentator. He is the Australian Broadcasting Corporation's chief election analyst.

Early years and background
Born in Warrington, Lancashire, in northern England, Green emigrated to Australia with his family in 1964. He attended James Ruse Agricultural High School in Sydney, graduating in 1977. Green graduated with a Bachelor of Science in mathematics and computing, and a Bachelor of Economics with honours in politics from the University of Sydney. He worked initially as a data analyst in the computing industry and for a polling company before joining the ABC in 1989. Green recalls he saw an ad for a six-month position as an ABC election researcher and applied, along with 150 other applicants. His experience and his “slightly bubbly personality” helped him get the position. ABC producer Ian Carroll and journalist Kerry O’Brien recommended he stay on and he remains with the ABC until today.

Career
Green first appeared on the ABC's election-night television coverage in the 1991 New South Wales election, following with the federal election in 1993.

, he had analysed over 70Australian elections at the territory, state and federal level for the ABC, starting with the 1989 Queensland state election to the 2022 Australian federal election, his 12th federal election. He designed the computer system that he uses to display and predict election results based on automated result feeds from Australia's electoral commissions.

Green has also worked on elections from as far afield as Canada, New Zealand and the United Kingdom for the ABC.

As the ABC's Chief Election Analyst, Green is responsible for the content of its election website. He also has editorial responsibility for its data analysis and for their election night results service. He is considered "the face of election night coverage".

In time for the 2013 federal election campaign, Green helped introduce the voter engagement tool Vote Compass to the ABC website. It enables voters to gauge how their views align with candidates based on party's statements on issues and also provides Green and other analysts a dataset larger than traditional opinion polls. Green also writes a comprehensive blog on electoral matters.

Green has said that he tends not to do campaign commentary and that he "prefers to go into an election night with no preconceived view on the outcome and to just concentrate on understanding the data as it comes in".

In a 2015 interview, he explained that some of the work in preparation for his election night coverage can start years earlierincluding building up the database with candidates, polling places and past results and calculating the impact of redistributions. He also recounted the realisation of his recurring nightmare of the power outage during the on air coverage of the 2010 Victorian state election.

In addition to analysing and commenting on elections for the ABC, Green writes election analysis for third-party media outlets such as The Sydney Morning Herald and Crikey and has appeared before the Joint Standing Committee on Electoral Matters of the Australian Parliament urging reform of the ticket voting system used in Australian Senate elections.

Honours

In 2014, the University of Sydney recognised Green with an Honorary Doctor of Letters. This was followed in 2015 by appointment as an Adjunct Professor in Sydney University's Department of Government and International Relations, recognising Green's work in the study of elections. In the Australian 2017 Queen's Birthday Honours List, Green was appointed an Officer of the Order of Australia (AO) "for distinguished service to the broadcast media as an analyst and commentator for
state and federal elections, and to the community as a key interpreter of Australian
democracy."

Personal life
Green is an avid cyclist, taking long-distance biking trips mostly in Australia and Europe.

He is an ambassador for the Sydney Swans football club, a team in the AFL.

In popular culture

Green's contribution to political analysis was celebrated in the song "Antony Green" in the musical Keating!, where he was represented as an animated character.

References

External links
Antony Green's Election Blog
Antony Green's Election Blog Archive (ABC)
Profile: Antony Green, ABC Election News Summary

1960 births
Living people
Australian political commentators
Psephologists
ABC News (Australia) presenters
English emigrants to Australia
People from Warrington
University of Sydney alumni
People educated at James Ruse Agricultural High School
Officers of the Order of Australia
Australian political scientists